Totally Circus is a 30-minute children's reality series that aired on Disney Channel. It premiered June 16, 2000, and ended on September 24, 2000.

Episodes
 "Tryouts!" – 6/16/2000  
 "Totally Tired Troupers!" – 6/18/2000
 "Totally Anxious!" – 6/25/2000  
 "Totally Strict!" – 7/2/2000  
 "Totally Terrifying NEW Acts!" – 7/9/2000  
 "Total Identity Crisis!" - 7/16/2000
 "Totally Hot Temperatures!" – 7/23/2000 
 "Total Rain, Total Pain!" – 8/6/2000 
 "Totally Jealous!" – 8/13/2000
 "Totally Uplifting!" – 8/20/2000  
 "Totally Backward!" – 8/27/2000
 "Totally Joking!" – 9/3/2000
 "Totally Tired!" 9/10/2000
 "Totally Too Short Summer!" – 9/17/2000 
 "Totally Cheerful, Totally Tearful!" – 9/24/2000

External links
 

2000s American reality television series
2000 American television series debuts
2000 American television series endings
Circus television shows
Disney Channel original programming
English-language television shows
Television series by Disney